A Goat's Tail is a 2006 British-Ghanaian film and is the directorial debut feature of Julius Amedume who also wrote the script.

The film won the Best Feature award at the 2007 Los Angeles Pan African Film Festival.

Plot 
A young taxi driver named Kojo, is awoken on his break by a woman named Cynthia. Cynthia is a young actress visiting Ghana and hires Kojo as her guide around, their interaction ends with a sexual rendezvous. Cynthia reluctantly invites Kojo to the United Kingdom to live out his dream as a poet. He soon understands that it is not all what it seems as he encounters an underworld of drug culture.

Cast 

 Simon James Morgan as Jimmy
 Jason Ramsey as Adrian
 Danny John-Jules 
 Lesley Cook as Cynthia 
 M.C Creed as Fredrick
 Kwabena Paul Akorfaala as Kojo
 Godfred Nortey as Kojo
 Adrian Philips as Wayne

References

External links
Variety review
 
 At Mubi 

2006 films
Ghanaian drama films
British drama films
2000s English-language films
English-language Ghanaian films
2000s British films